The 2021–22 season is Accrington Stanley's 53rd year in their history and fourth consecutive season in League One. Along with the league, the club will also compete in the FA Cup, the EFL Cup and the EFL Trophy. The season covers the period from 1 July 2021 to 30 June 2022.

Pre-season friendlies
Accrington Stanley announced they will play friendly matches against Clitheroe, Blackpool, Preston North End, Warrington Town and Bradford City as part of their pre-season preparations.

Competitions

League One

League table

Results summary

Results by matchday

Matches
Stanley's fixtures were announced on 24 June 2021.

August

September

October

November

December

January

February

March

April

FA Cup

Accrington were drawn away to Port Vale in the first round.

EFL Cup

Accrington Stanley were drawn away to Rotherham United in the first round and Oldham Athletic in the second round.

EFL Trophy

Stanley were drawn into Northern Group G alongside Barrow, Leicester City U21 and Fleetwood Town.

Transfers

Transfers in

Loans in

Loans out

Transfers out

References

Accrington Stanley
Accrington Stanley F.C. seasons